Concrete Law is the debut solo studio album by American rapper and the Dungeon Family member Backbone. It was released on June 19, 2001 via Universal Records. Production was handled by Organized Noize, Brandon Peters, Lucky Calhoun, Montez Harris, Cee-Lo, Earthtone III, Edex, Mark Twayne, Marvin "Chanz" Parkman and Rondal Rucker. It features guest appearances from Slic Patna, Blvd. International, Big Rube, C-Bone, Chamdon, Cool Breeze, Joi, Killer Mike, Sleepy Brown, Slimm Calhoun, Witchdoctor, YoungBloodZ, and all the four members of the Goodie Mob. The album peaked at number 128 on the Billboard 200 and number 28 on the Top R&B/Hip-Hop Albums in the United States. Its lead single, "5 Deuce 4 Tre", gained minor success on the Billboard charts reaching #93 on the Hot R&B/Hip-Hop Songs.

Track listing

Charts

References

External links

2001 debut albums
Dungeon Family albums
Universal Records albums
Albums produced by Organized Noize